The 2016–17 season was Plymouth Argyle's sixth consecutive season in League Two and their 131st year in existence. Along with competing in League Two, the club also participated in the FA Cup, League Cup and League Trophy. The season covers the period from 1 July 2016 to 30 June 2017.

Pre-season

League Two

League table

Results by round

Matches

On 22 June 2016, the fixtures for the forthcoming season were announced.

EFL Cup

Matches

FA Cup

EFL Trophy

Statistics

|-
|colspan=14|First team players out on loan:

|-
|colspan=14|First team player(s) that left the club:

|}

Goals record

Disciplinary Record

Transfers

Transfers in

Transfers out

Loans in

Loans out

References

Plymouth Argyle
Plymouth Argyle F.C. seasons